Gustav Anthony Ekberg (August 25, 1898 – September 23, 1952), sometimes spelled Gus Eckberg, was a professional American football fullback in the National Football League. He played in one game for the Cleveland Bulldogs in 1925.

References

External links
 Pro-Football reference

1898 births
1952 deaths
Cleveland Bulldogs players
Minnesota Golden Gophers football players
Players of American football from Minneapolis
West Virginia Mountaineers football players